Rhopobota ancylimorpha is a moth of the family Tortricidae. It is found in Vietnam.

The wingspan is 19 mm. The ground colour of the forewings is white with brownish suffusions. The costal and dorsal spots and part of the termen are brown. The hindwings are grey.

Etymology
The name refers to the similarity to some representatives of the genus Ancylis.

References

Moths described in 2009
Eucosmini
Moths of Asia
Taxa named by Józef Razowski